Frederick Shaw may refer to:

 Frederick Davis Shaw (1909–1977), Canadian politician
 Frederick H. Shaw (1864–1924), British politician and economist
 Frederick Shaw (British Army officer) (1861–1942), British Army general
 Sir Frederick Shaw, 3rd Baronet (1799–1876), Irish Conservative Member of Parliament
 Frederick Shaw (Queensland politician) (1824–1902), Australian politician
 Frederick Shaw (Tasmanian politician), Australian politician
 Frederick Shaw (cricketer) (1892–1935), Irish cricketer and British Army officer
 Frederick B. Shaw (1869–1957), United States Army officer

See also
 Fred Shaw (disambiguation), several people